The 9th International 500-Mile Sweepstakes Race was held at the Indianapolis Motor Speedway on Monday, May 30, 1921.

Ralph DePalma dominated another early running of the 500, but again failed to win. He led 109 laps, and had a two-lap lead at the halfway point. A connecting rod broke, and he dropped out on lap 112. DePalma retired with one win, and 612 laps led in the "500." His laps led record would not be matched for 66 years until Al Unser, Sr. reached it in 1987.

Tommy Milton won the first of two 500 victories. He was accompanied by riding mechanic Harry Franck. The only European car to finish was a 1921 Grand Prix Sunbeam driven by Ora Haibe who was placed fifth.

Time trials
Time trials was scheduled for five days, May 25–29. Four-lap (10 mile) qualifying runs were utilized. A short field of only 26 cars submitted entries, but only 23 cars arrived and prepared to qualify. Mervin Headley's entry was disallowed because only half the entry fee was paid. Two other entries were no-shows.

Ralph De Palma completed his qualifying run on Wednesday May 25, at an average speed of 100.75 mph. He won the pole position as the only driver over the 100 mph mark. None of his four laps matched the track record (104.78 mph) set in 1919.

This would be the first 500 that featured the familiar starting grid of rows of cars three-abreast.

Results

Race details
For 1921, riding mechanics were required.
First alternate: none

References

Indianapolis 500 races
Indianapolis 500
Indianapolis 500
1921 in American motorsport
May 1921 sports events